The TOJ SS02 is a 2-liter sports prototype race car, designed, developed and built by German racing team and constructor, Team Obermoser Jörg; constructed to the FIA's Group 5 category and specification of racing, specifically the European 2-Litre Sportscar Championship, in 1975. Its career spanned seven years, and in that period of time, it managed 2 class wins, and 3 podium finishes, and one pole position. It was powered by a naturally-aspirated  BMW M12/7 four-cylinder engine; producing .

References

Sports prototypes
24 Hours of Le Mans race cars